"An Evening with Brian McKnight" is the 1st live album by American recording artist Brian McKnight and was released on September 23, 2016. A DVD/BR release of the concert was released as well.

It features the singles "Everything" and "Forever."

Track listing
Find Myself In You (Live) 7:38   
Used To Be My Girl (Live) 2:57   
Shoulda, Woulda, Coulda (Live) 3:14   
The Only One For Me (Live) 7:15   
My Kind Of Girl (Live) 2:43   
Crazy Love (Live) 6:57   
6,8,12 (Live) 5:44   
On The Down Low (Live) 4:15   
The Rest Of My Life (Live) 2:50   
One Last Cry (Live) 3:08   
Anytime (Live) 5:56   
Back At One (Live) 3:44   
Fall 5.0 (Live) 5:16   
Still (Live) 5:27   
Everything 3:23   
Forever 3:41   
Brothers In The End [feat. Gino Vannelli] 3:29

References

2016 live albums
Brian McKnight albums
Albums produced by Brian McKnight